A funhouse is a type of amusement facility.

Funhouse may also refer to:

Film and television 
Andy's Funhouse, a 1970s television special/pilot
Fun House (film), 2016 American war film
Fun House (American game show), an American children's television game show
Fun House (British game show), a British children's television game show based on the US game show
The Funhouse, a 1981 horror film directed by Tobe Hooper
"Funhouse" (The Sopranos), a 2000 episode of The Sopranos from Season 2
Scooby's Mystery Funhouse, a 1980s Scooby-Doo television series
TV Funhouse, a recurring skit on NBC's Saturday Night Live
Fun Haus, a villain resembling Jack Nimball's version of Toyman appearing in Batman: The Brave and The Bold
 "The Funhouse", a 1985 episode of the cartoon G.I. Joe: A Real American Hero
Funhouse (2019 film), a horror film starring Valter Skarsgård

Games 
FunHouse (pinball), a 1990 pinball game
Fun House (board game), loosely based on the US game show
Fun House (video game), loosely based on the US game show
Krusty's Fun House, a 1992 video game based on the cartoon series The Simpsons

Music

Albums
Fun House (The Stooges album), a 1970 album by The Stooges
Funhouse (Kid 'n Play album), a 1990 album by rap duo, Kid 'n Play
Fun House (Bob & Tom album), a 1997 comedy album by The Bob and Tom Show
Fun House, a 1998 comedy album by Dana Gould
Here We Go: Live at the Funhouse, a 2000 album by Run-D.M.C.
Fun House, a 2001 album by Bonepony
Fun House (Reuben Wilson album), 2005
Funhouse (Pink album), 2008
Funhouse Tour, a tour by Pink in support of the album
Funhouse, 2008 jazz album by Gerry Mulligan
Fun House, 2013 jazz album by Benoît Delbecq and Fred Hersch

Songs
"Funhouse" (song), the fifth single from the Pink album of the same name
"Funhouse" song by Iggy Pop from Roadkill Rising: The Bootleg Collection: 1977-2009

Other 
The Funhouse (novel), the film's novelization by Dean Koontz
Fun Home, a 2006 graphic memoir by Alison Bechdel
Fun Home (musical), a theatrical adaptation of Bechdel's memoir
Funhaus, a division of media and entertainment company Rooster Teeth